Philip Young is a citizen of South Africa who was convicted of murder in Afghanistan.

Incident and conviction
According to Young he was working in Afghanistan for Anham, a subcontractor of the Drug Enforcement Administration. Anham was a logistics supplier for the company. Young was Anham's deputy project manager for Afghanistan. He acknowledges shooting an Afghan on 1 October 2009—a former employee, but describes the killing as self-defense. Young was released from prison on 17 May 2012. In the Appellate Court Young was given sixteen years in prison. After the Appellate Court, Young was then represented by American Attorney Kimberley Motley in Afghanistan's Supreme Court. In the Supreme Court, Young's sentence was reduced to seven years in prison.

Young described disgruntled Abdul Ghafar, his former subordinate, opening fire on his vehicle, and that he had merely returned fire. The South African newspaper The Independent quoted Thinus Coetzee, of Amnesty International. He called Young's conviction "deeply flawed"

Imprisonment
Young described being held in a communal cell, with fifteen other men, during his pre-trial detention. He described being held with Taliban and al Qaeda suspects, and had been called upon to fight for his life with fellow prisoners.

Following his conviction he was held in a special counter-narcotics prison and in the Pul-e-Charkihi prison. Conditions improved there. Anham colleagues were allowed to bring him a birthday cake, although he wasn't allowed to eat any of it.

Ultimately, Motley lobbied for Young's early release from prison to the Afghan President Hamid Karzai and he served over two years in prison.   His release followed a decree from Afghan President Hamid Karzai.

References

20th-century births
2021 deaths
South African people convicted of murder
White South African people
Year of birth missing